The county governor of Innlandet county in Norway represents the central government administration in the county.

Innlandet county (with its current borders) was established on 1 January 2020 after the merger of the old Hedmark and Oppland counties. In preparation for the county merger, the government of Norway merged the offices of County Governor of Hedmark and County Governor of Oppland into one office starting on 1 January 2019.

The county governor is the government's representative in the county. The governor carries out the resolutions and guidelines of the Storting and government. This is done first by the county governor performing administrative tasks on behalf of the ministries.  Secondly, the county governor also monitors the activities of the municipalities and is the appeal body for many types of municipal decisions.

Name
The title of the office was originally  but on 1 January 2021, the title was changed to the gender-neutral .

List of county governors
Innlandet county has had the following governors:

See also
For the county governors of this area prior to 2020, see: 
List of county governors of Hedmark
List of county governors of Oppland

References

Innlandet
County Governor